Rapa Nui or Rapanui (Rapa Nui: ,), also known as Pascuan or Pascuense, is an Eastern Polynesian language of the Austronesian language family. It is spoken on the island of Rapa Nui, also known as Easter Island.

The island is home to a population of just under 6,000 and is a special territory of Chile. According to census data, there are 9,399 people (on both the island and the Chilean mainland) who identify as ethnically Rapa Nui. Census data does not exist on the primary known and spoken languages among these people. In 2008, the number of fluent speakers was reported as low as 800. Rapa Nui is a minority language and many of its adult speakers also speak Spanish. Most Rapa Nui children now grow up speaking Spanish and those who do learn Rapa Nui begin learning it later in life.

History
The Rapa Nui language is isolated within Eastern Polynesian, which also includes the Marquesic and Tahitic languages. Within Eastern Polynesian, it is closest to Marquesan morphologically, although its phonology has more in common with New Zealand Māori, as both languages are relatively conservative in retaining consonants lost in other Eastern Polynesian languages.

Like all Polynesian languages, Rapa Nui has relatively few consonants. Uniquely for an Eastern Polynesian language, Rapa Nui has preserved the original glottal stop of Proto-Polynesian. It is, or until recently was, a verb-initial language.

One of the most important recent books written about the language of Rapa Nui is Verónica du Feu's Rapanui (Descriptive Grammar).

Very little is known about the Rapa Nui language prior to European contact. The majority of Rapa Nui vocabulary is inherited directly from Proto–Eastern Polynesian. Due to extensive borrowing from Tahitian there now often exist two forms for what was the same word in the early language. For example, Rapa Nui has Tahitian  alongside original  for 'to see', both derived from Proto-Eastern Polynesian *kitea. There are also hybridized forms of words such as  'to teach', from native  (causative prefix) and Tahitian .

According to archaeologist José Miguel Ramírez "more than a dozen Mapuche - Rapa Nui cognates have been described", chiefly by Sebastian Englert. Among these are the Mapuche/Rapa Nui words toki/toki (axe), kuri/uri (black) and piti/iti (little).

Language notes from 1770 and 1774
Spanish notes from a 1770 visit to the island record 94 words and terms. Many are clearly Polynesian, but several are not easily recognizable. For example, the numbers from one to ten seemingly have no relation to any known language. They are compared with contemporary Rapa Nui words, in parenthesis:

 cojàna
 corena
 cogojù
 quirote
 majanà
 teùto
 tejèa
 moroqui
 vijoviri
 queromata-paùpaca quacaxixiva

It may be that the list is a misunderstanding, and the words not related to numbers at all. The Spanish may have shown Arabic numerals to the islanders who did not understand their meaning, and likened them to some other abstraction. For example, the "moroqui" for number eight would have actually been , a small fish that is used as a bait, since "8" can look like a simple drawing of a fish.

Captain James Cook visited the island four years later, and had a Tahitian interpreter with him, who, while recognizing some Polynesian words (up to 17 were written down), was not able to converse with the islanders in general. The British also attempted to record the numerals and were able to record the correct Polynesian words.

Post-Peruvian enslavement
In the 1860s the Peruvian slave raids began, as Peruvians were experiencing labor shortages and came to regard the Pacific as a vast source of free labor. Slavers raided islands as far away as Micronesia, but Rapa Nui was much closer and became a prime target.

In December 1862 eight Peruvian ships landed their crewmen and between bribery and outright violence they captured some 1,000 Rapanui, including the king, his son, and the ritual priests (one of the reasons for so many gaps in knowledge of the ancient ways). It has been estimated that 2,000 Rapanui were captured over a period of years. Those who survived to arrive in Peru were poorly treated, overworked, and exposed to diseases. Ninety percent of the Rapa Nui died within one or two years of capture.

Eventually the Bishop of Tahiti caused a public outcry and an embarrassed Peru rounded up the few survivors to return them. A shipload headed to Rapa Nui, but smallpox broke out en route and only 15 arrived at the island. They were put ashore. The resulting smallpox epidemic nearly wiped out the remaining population.

In the aftermath of the Peruvian slave deportations in the 1860s, Rapa Nui came under extensive outside influence from neighbouring Polynesian languages such as Tahitian. While the majority of the population that was taken to work as slaves in the Peruvian mines died of diseases and bad treatment in the 1860s, hundreds of other Islanders who left for Mangareva in the 1870s and 1880s to work as servants or labourers adopted the local form of Tahitian-Pidgin. Fischer argues that this pidgin became the basis for the modern Rapa Nui language when the surviving part of the Rapa Nui immigrants on Mangareva returned to their almost deserted home island.

Language notes from 1886
William J. Thomson, paymaster on the USS Mohican, spent twelve days on Rapa Nui from 19 to 30 December 1886. Among the data Thomson collected was the Rapa Nui calendar.

Language notes from the twentieth century
Father Sebastian Englert, a German missionary living on Easter Island during 1935–1969, published a partial Rapa Nui–Spanish dictionary in his La Tierra de Hotu Matua in 1948, trying to save what was left of the old language. Despite the many typographical mistakes, the dictionary is valuable, because it provides a wealth of examples which all appear drawn from a real corpus, part oral traditions and legends, part actual conversations.

Englert recorded vowel length, stress, and glottal stop, but was not always consistent, or perhaps the misprints make it seem so. He indicated vowel length with a circumflex, and stress with an acute accent, but only when it does not occur where expected. The glottal stop  is written as an apostrophe, but is often omitted.

Rongorongo

It is assumed that rongorongo, a possible undeciphered script once used on Rapa Nui, transcribes the old Rapa Nui language if it is indeed a true writing system.

Hispanisation
The island is under the jurisdiction of Chile since 1888 and is now home to a number of Chilean continentals. The influence of the Spanish language is noticeable in modern Rapa Nui speech. As fewer children learn to speak Rapa Nui at an early age, their superior knowledge of Spanish affects the 'passive knowledge' they have of Rapa Nui. A version of Rapanui interspersed with Spanish nouns, verbs and adjectives has become a popular form of casual speech. The most well integrated borrowings are the Spanish conjunctions  (or),  (but) and y (and). Spanish words such as problema (problem), which was once rendered as poroporema, are now often integrated with minimal or no change.

Spanish words are still often used within Rapanui grammatical rules, though some word order changes are occurring and it is argued that Rapanui may be undergoing a shift from VSO to the Spanish SVO. This example sentence was recorded first in 1948 and again in 2001 and its expression has changed from VSO to SVO.

'They both suffer and weep'
1948: he aroha, he tatagi ararua
2001: ararua he aroha he tatagi

Rapa Nui's indigenous Rapanui toponymy has survived with few Spanish additions or replacements, a fact that has been attributed in part to the survival of the Rapa Nui language. This contrasts with the toponymy of continental Chile, which has lost many of its indigenous names.

Phonology
Rapa Nui has ten consonants and five vowels.

Consonants

As present generation Rapa Nui speak Spanish as their first language in younger years and learn Rapa Nui later in life, flap  in word-initial position can be pronounced alveolar trill .

Vowels
{| class="wikitable" style="text-align: center;"
|-
!
! Front
! Central
! Back
|-
! High
| 
|
| 
|-
! Mid
| 
|
| 
|-
! Low
|
| 
|
|}

All vowels can be either long or short and are always long when they are stressed in the final position of a word. Most vowel sequences are present, with the exception of *uo.

Orthography
Written Rapanui uses the Latin script. The Latin alphabet for Rapanui consists of 20 letters:

 A, Ā, E, Ē, H, I, Ī, K, M, N, Ŋ, O, Ō, P, R, T, U, Ū, V, 

In electronic texts, the glottal plosive  may be written with a (always lower-case) saltillo  to avoid the problems of using the punctuation mark . A special letter, is sometimes used to distinguish the Spanish , occurring in introduced terms, from the Rapa Nui . Similarly,  has been written  to distinguish it from Spanish g. The IPA letter  is now also coming into use.

Morphology

Syllable structure
Syllables in Rapa Nui are CV (consonant-vowel) or V (vowel). There are no consonant clusters or word-final consonants.

Reduplication
The reduplication of whole nouns or syllable parts performs a variety of different functions within Rapa Nui. To describe colours for which there is not a predefined word, the noun for an object of a like colour is duplicated to form an adjective. For example:

  (mist) →  (dark grey)
  (dawn) →  (white)

Besides forming adjectives from nouns, the reduplication of whole words can indicate a multiple or intensified action. For example:

  (weave) →  (fold)
  (undo) →  (take to pieces)
  (dive) →  (go diving)

There are some apparent duplicate forms for which the original form has been lost. For example:
  (tired)

The reduplication of the initial syllable in verbs can indicate plurality of subject or object. In this example the bolded section represents the reduplication of a syllable which indicates the plurality of the subject of a transitive verb:
  (dance):
  (he/she/they is/are dancing)
  (they are all dancing)

The reduplication of the final two syllables of a verb indicates plurality or intensity. In this example the bolded section represents the reduplication of two final syllables, indicating intensity or emphasis:

  (tell):
  (Tell the story)
  (Tell the whole story)

Borrowed words

Rapa Nui incorporates a number of borrowed words in which constructions such as consonant clusters or word-final consonants occur, though they do not occur naturally in the language. Historically, the practice was to transliterate unfamiliar consonants, insert vowels between clustered consonants and append word-final vowels where necessary.

e.g.: Britain (English loanword) → Peretane (Rapa Nui rendering)

More recently, loanwords – which come primarily from Spanish – retain their consonant clusters. For example, "litro" (litre).

Word Classes
Rapa Nui can be said to have a basic two-way distinction in its words, much like other Polynesian languages. That is between full words, and particles. Full words occur in the head of the phrase and are mostly open classes (exceptions like locationals exist). Particles occur in fixed positions before or after the head, and have a high frequency. There also exists an intermediate category, Pro-Forms, which occur in the head of a phrase, and can be preceded or followed by a particle. Unlike full words, they do not have lexical meaning, and like particles, form a closed class. Pro-forms include personal, possessive and benefactive pronouns, as well as interrogative words. Additionally, two other intermediate categories are the negator (ina) and the numerals. While both of them form a closed class, they are able to function as phrase nuclei.

Demonstratives 
Rapa Nui doesn't have one class of demonstratives, instead it has four classes of particles with demonstrative functions. Each class is made up of three particles of different degrees of distance; proximal, medial, or distal. This is a three-way distinction, similar to Samoan and Māori, two closely related languages from the same language family. Tongan, by contrast, has a two-way contrast.

Rapa Nui speakers hence distinguish between entities that are close to the speaker (proximal), something at a medium distance or close to the hearer (medial), and something far away, removed from both the speaker and hearer (distal). This is called a person-oriented system, in which one of the demonstratives denotes a referent in proximity of the hearer. For Rapa Nui speakers, that is the medial distinction, //. This system of spatial contrasts and directions is known as spatial deixis, and Rapa Nui is full of ways to express this, be it through locationals, postverbal or postnominal demonstratives, or directionals.

These four classes that function as demonstratives are similar in form, but differ in syntactic status and have certain differences in functions.

Postnominal Demonstratives 
The postnominal demonstratives are used to indicate different degrees of distance. They always occur on the right periphery of the noun phrase.

Postnominal demonstratives are obligatory when following a t-demonstrative (tau/tou/tū) unless the noun phrase contains the identity marker ā/ ana. They can also co-occur with other determiners, like articles in this example:

Postnominal demonstratives can be used deictically or anaphorically. As deictic markers they are used to point at something visible, while as anaphoric markers they refer to entities in discourse context (entities which have been discussed before or are known by other means). In practice, the anaphoric use is much more common.

Distal/Neutral era 
 is used deictically to point to something at a distance from both speaker and hearer.

However, it's more common to see  used anaphorically, as a general purpose demonstrative.  is often found co-occurring with the neutral t-demonstrative determiner, as the general form tau/tou/tū (N) era, and this combination doubles as a common strategy to refer to a participant mentioned earlier in the discourse. So common, that era is the seventh most common word overall in the text corpus.

For example, the two main characters in this story are simply referred to as tau taŋata era 'that man' and tau vi e era 'that woman'.

era is also used in combination anaphorically with te, a more conventional determiner instead of a demonstrative determiner. Rapa Nui uses this combination to refer to something which is known to both speaker and hearer, regardless of whether it has been mentioned in the discourse. This means the "te N era" construction (Where N is a noun), indicates definiteness, making it the closest equivalent to English (or Spanish) definite article, rather than a demonstrative.

Te N era can also be used to refer to entities which are generally known, or presumed to be present in context. In the example, the cliffs refer to the cliffs in general, which can be presumed to be known by all Rapa Nui speakers on Rapa Nui with the coastline being a familiar feature. No specific cliff is meant.

Deictic Locationals 
Deictic locationals utilize the same form as demonstrative determiners (nei, nā and rā). They can be the head of a phrase as they are locationals, and like other locationals they can be preceded by a preposition, but not by a determiner. They indicate distance with respect to the origo, which is either the speaker or the discourse situation.

Pronouns
Pronouns are usually marked for number: in Rapa Nui there are markers for first, second and third personal singular and plural; however, there is only a marker for dual in the first person. The first person dual and plural can mark for exclusive and inclusive. The pronouns are always ahead of the person singular (PRS) a and relational particle (RLT) i or dative (DAT) ki. However, in some examples, they do not have PRS, RLT and DAT.

There is only one paradigm of pronouns for Rapa Nui. They function the same in both subject and object cases.

Here is the table for the pronoun forms in Rapa Nui:

Questions
Yes/no questions are distinguished from statements chiefly by a particular pattern of intonation. Where there is no expectation of a particular answer, the form remains the same as a statement.

Conjunction
Original Rapa Nui has no conjunctive particles. Copulative, adversative and disjunctive notions are typically communicated by context or clause order. Modern Rapa Nui has almost completely adopted Spanish conjunctions rather than rely on this.

Possession

Alienable and inalienable possession 

In the Rapa Nui, there are alienable and inalienable possession. Lichtenberk described alienable possession as the possessed noun being contingently associated with the possessor, and on the other hand inalienable possession as the possessed noun being necessarily associated with the possessor. The distinction is marked by a possessive suffix inserted before the relevant pronoun.
Possessive particles:
  (alienable) expresses dominant possession
Alienable possession is used to refer to a person's spouse, children, food, books, work, all animals (except horses), all tools and gadgets (including refrigerators), and some illnesses.

 (children) is an alienable possession therefore a is used to indicate that in this sentence, therefore the possessive pronoun a is used instead of ooku.

  (inalienable) expresses the subordinate possession
It is used with parents, siblings, house, furniture, transports (including carts, cars, scooters, boats, airplanes), clothes, feeling, native land, parts of the body (including mind), horses, and their bridles.

 
Inalienable possession o is used in this example, therefore ooku instead of aaku is used. It is talking about the speaker's brother, which is an inalienable relation.

There are no markers to distinguish between temporary or permanent possession; the nature of objects possessed; or between past, present or future possession.

A and O possession 
A and O possession refer to alienable and inalienable possession in Rapa Nui.  marks for alienable possession and  marks for inalienable possession. a and o are marked as suffixes of the possessive pronouns; however, they are only marked when the possessive pronoun is in the first, second or third person singular. In (2) above, taina 'sibling' is inalienable and the possessor is first person singular ooku 'my'. However, for all the other situations, a and o are not marked as a suffix of the possessor. 
 

In the above example, the possessor mee 'those' is not a possessive pronoun of the first, second or third person singular. Therefore, o is marked not as a suffix of the possessor but a separate word in the sentence.

Classifiers
There are no classifiers in the Rapa Nui language.

Exclamation
Ko and ka are exclamatory indicators.
 suggests a personal reaction:
Ko te aroha (Poor thing!)
 suggests judgement on external events:
Ka haakiaki (Tell the whole story!)

Compound words
Terms which did not exist in original Rapa Nui were created via compounding:
 = ('spear fish') = harpoon
 = ('spear food') = fork
 = ('skin foot') = shoe
 = ('bird spear') = wasp
 = ('stool horse') = saddle
 = ('stool stay') = chair

Negation 
In Rapa Nui, negation is indicated by free standing morphemes. Rapa Nui has four main negators:

ina (neutral)
kai (perfective)
(e)ko (imperfective)
tae (constituent negator)

Additionally there are also two additional particles/ morphemes which also contribute to negation in Rapa Nui:

kore (Existential/noun negator)
hia / ia (verb phrase particle which occurs in combination with different negators to form the meaning 'not yet')

Negation occurs as preverbal particles in the verb phrase, with the clausal negator kai and (e)ko occurring in first position in the verbal phrase, while the constituent negator (tae) occurs in second position in the verbal phrase. Clausal negators occur in the same position as aspect markers and subordinators—this means it is impossible for these elements to co-occur. As a result, negative clauses tend to have fewer aspectual distinctions. Hia occurs in eighth position as a post-verbal marker. Verbal negators precede adjectives. The table below roughly depicts the positions of negators in the Verb Phrase:

Position in the verb phrase

Clausal negators

Ina 
Ina is the neutral negator (regarding aspect). It has the widest range of use in a variety of contexts. It usually occurs in imperfective contexts, as well as habitual clauses and narrative contexts, and is used to negate actions and states. It almost always occurs clause initially and is always followed by the neutral aspectual he + noun or he + verb.

In the example above ina is followed by the combination of he+ maeha (noun)

In this example, ina is followed by he + takea (verb)

In addition to negating verbal and nominal clauses, it also functions as the term ꞌnoꞌas shown below:

Unlike the other two clausal negators (which are preverbal particles), ina is a phrase head, thus it can form a constituent of its own.

Kai 
Kai negates clauses with perfective aspects.

It is used to negate past events and narrative events, and is usually combined with ina. It is also used to negate stative verbs, and a verb phrase marked with kai may contain various post-verbal particles such as the continuity marker â / ana. This marker occurs when the clause has perfect aspect (often obligatory with the perfect marker ko). When combined with kai, it indicates that the negative state continues.

(E)ko 
(E)ko is the imperfective negator, which (like kai) replaces the aspectual marker in front of the verb, and which can occur with the negator ina.

It marks negative commands in imperatives (usually with ina) with the e often excluded in imperatives.

In other contexts, especially when ina is absent, the e is obligatory.

Constituent negator

Tae 
Tae is a constituent negator used to negate anything other than a main clause. This can be subordinate clauses, prepositional phrases, possessive predicates and other non-verbal clauses. It also negates nominalised verbs and sub-constituents such as adjectives and quantifiers. It does not negate nouns (this is done by the noun negator kore). It is also used to negate locative phrases, actor emphasis constructions, and is also used to reinforce the preposition mai.

Tae is an indicator for subordinate clauses, as it can also negate subordinate clauses without subordinate markers (in which case it usually occurs with an aspect marker).

It also occurs in main clauses with main clause negators and aspect markers i and e, when the clause has a feature of a subordinate clause such as oblique constituents

Noun negator: kore 
kore is a verb meaning 'the absence or lack of something'.

It immediately follows the noun in the adjective position, and is used to indicate that the entity expressed by the noun or noun modifier does not exist or is lacking in the given context.

Hia / ia 
Hia / ia is a morpheme used immediately after negated verbs and co-occurs with a negator to indicate actions or events which are interrupted or are yet to happen.

Double negation 
In Rapa Nui, double negation is more frequent than single negation (with the negator ina often co-occurring with another clause negator most of the time). It is often used as a slight reinforcement or emphasis.

Ina can be combined with negators kai and (e)ko- both of these are main clause negators.

In the example above we see the negator ina co-occurring with the perfective negator kai.

When tae occurs in double negation, if the other negator is kai or (e)ko, the negative polarity is cancelled out.

Ina only negates main clauses so it never combines with the negator tae, which is a subordinate clause negator. When occurring with ina, negation may be reinforced.

Double negation occurs very frequently in imperatives in particular.

Numerals
There is a system for the numerals 1–10 in both Rapa Nui and Tahitian, both of which are used, though all numbers higher than ten are expressed in Tahitian. When counting, all numerals whether Tahitian or Rapanui are preceded by ka. This is not used however, when using a number in a sentence.

Syntax

Word order 
Rapa Nui is a VSO (verb–subject–object) language. Except where verbs of sensing are used, the object of a verb is marked by the relational particle .

e.g.: He hakahu koe i te rama (the relational particle and object are bolded)
"You light the torch"

Where a verb of sensing is used, the subject is marked by the agentive particle .
e.g.: He tikea e au te poki (the agentive particle and subject are bolded)
"I can see the child"

Directionals 
Spatial deictics is also present in Rapa Nui, in the form of two directionals: mai and atu. They indicate direction with respect to a specific deictic centre or locus.

  indicates movement towards the deictic centre, hence the gloss hither.
 atu indicates movement away from the deictic centre, and is as such glossed as away. They are both reflexes of a larger system in Proto-Polynesian.

Postverbal Demonstratives 
The postverbal demonstratives (PVDs) have the same form as the postnominal demonstratives, and they have the same meaning:

 : proximity, close to the speaker
 : medial distance, close to the hearer
 : default PVD; farther distance, removed from both speaker and hearer.

How they differ from postnominal demonstratives is their function/where they can appear, as it is quite limited. They can only appear in certain syntactic contexts, listed here:

 PVDs are common after imperfective e to express a progressive or habitual action.
 The contiguous marker ka is often followed by a PVD, both in main and subordinate clauses.
 With the perfect ko V ā, era is occasionally used to express an action which is well and truly finished.
 PVDs also appear in relative clauses

Overall, their main function is to provide nuance to the aspectual marker they are being used alongside.

References
From Du Feu, Veronica (1996). Rapanui.

From Kieviet, Paulus (2017). A Grammar of Rapa Nui.

Other footnotes

ACT:action
LIM:limitative
PPD:postpositive determinant
PRS:person singular
RLT:relational particle
STA:state (verbal)
TOW:towards subject
EMP:emphasis
GRP:group plural
RES:resultative
PROX:proximal demonstrative
PRED:predicate marker
NTR:neutral aspect
PROP:proper article
SUBS:subsequent
CONNEG:constituent negator

Bibliography

  Text was copied from this source, which is available under a Creative Commons Attribution 4.0 International License.

Pagel, S., 2008. The old, the new, the in-between: Comparative aspects of Hispanisation on the Marianas and Easter Island (Rapa Nui). In T. Stolz, D. Bakker, R.S. Palomo (eds) Hispanisation: The Impact of Spanish on the Lexicon and Grammar of the Indigenous Languages of Austronesia and the Americas. Berlin: Mouton de Gruyter, pp. 167–201.

External links

Englert's Rapa Nui dictionary: Internet Archive version from 2007-10-16
Mirror of Englert's Rapa Nui dictionary
Rapa Nui Swadesh vocabulary list (Wiktionary)
Rapa Nui words from the Austronesian Basic Vocabulary Database
Miki Makihara (Queens College), has several papers on contemporary Rapa Nui language and language revival efforts

Analytic languages
Easter Island
Isolating languages
East Polynesian languages
Languages of Chile
Verb–subject–object languages
Endangered Austronesian languages
Endangered languages of Oceania
Severely endangered languages